Elections to Limavady Borough Council were held on 19 May 1993 on the same day as the other Northern Irish local government elections. The election used three district electoral areas to elect a total of 15 councillors.

Election results

Note: "Votes" are the first preference votes.

Districts summary

|- class="unsortable" align="centre"
!rowspan=2 align="left"|Ward
! % 
!Cllrs
! % 
!Cllrs
! %
!Cllrs
! %
!Cllrs
! % 
!Cllrs
!rowspan=2|TotalCllrs
|- class="unsortable" align="center"
!colspan=2 bgcolor="" | SDLP
!colspan=2 bgcolor="" | UUP
!colspan=2 bgcolor="" | DUP
!colspan=2 bgcolor="" | Sinn Féin
!colspan=2 bgcolor="white"| Others
|-
|align="left"|Bellarena
|bgcolor="#99FF66"|53.7
|bgcolor="#99FF66"|3
|36.8
|2
|9.4
|0
|0.0
|0
|0.0
|0
|5
|-
|align="left"|Benbradagh
|33.3
|2
|bgcolor="40BFF5"|37.5
|bgcolor="40BFF5"|2
|0.0
|0
|29.1
|1
|0.0
|0
|5
|-
|align="left"|Limavady Town
|34.1
|2
|bgcolor="40BFF5"|44.6
|bgcolor="40BFF5"|2
|21.3
|1
|0.0
|0
|0.0
|0
|5
|-
|- class="unsortable" class="sortbottom" style="background:#C9C9C9"
|align="left"| Total
|40.3
|7
|39.9
|6
|10.8
|1
|9.0
|1
|0.0
|0
|15
|-
|}

District results

Bellarena

1989: 3 x SDLP, 2 x UUP
1993: 3 x SDLP, 2 x UUP
1989–1993 Change: No change

Benbradagh

1989: 2 x UUP, 2 x SDLP, 1 x Sinn Féin
1993: 2 x UUP, 2 x SDLP, 1 x Sinn Féin
1989–1993 Change: No change

Limavady Town

1989: 3 x UUP, 1 x SDLP, 1 x DUP
1993: 2 x UUP, 2 x SDLP, 1 x DUP
1989–1993 Change: SDLP gain from UUP

References

Limavady Borough Council elections
Limavady